The marbled sand frog (Tomopterna marmorata) is a species of frog in the family Pyxicephalidae that is native to East and southern Africa.

Range
It is found in Botswana, Kenya, Malawi, Mozambique, South Africa, Zambia, and Zimbabwe, and possibly Namibia,  Eswatini, and  Tanzania.

Habitat
Its natural habitats are dry savanna, moist savanna, subtropical or tropical dry shrubland, subtropical or tropical moist shrubland, rivers, intermittent rivers, intermittent freshwater lakes, freshwater marshes, intermittent freshwater marshes, arable land, pastureland, water storage areas, and ponds.

References

Tomopterna
Taxonomy articles created by Polbot
Amphibians described in 1854
Taxa named by Wilhelm Peters